The 1953 Chicago Cardinals season was the 34th season the team was in the league. The team failed to improve on their previous output of 4–8, winning only one game, the final game of the season. They failed to qualify for the playoffs for the fifth consecutive season.

Schedule

Standings

References 

1953
Chicago Cardinals
Chicago Card